Weightlifting was part of the 1993 National Games of China held in Beijing. For the first time in National Games history women were part of the event. Men competed in ten and women in nine weight classes.

The competition program at the National Games mirrors that of the Olympic Games as medals are only awarded for the total achieved, but not for individual lifts in either the snatch or clean and jerk. Likewise an athlete failing to register a snatch result cannot advance to the clean and jerk.

Medal summary

Men

Women

Medal table

References
Archived results of the 1993 Games 

1993 in weightlifting
1993 in Chinese sport
1993